The Reformed Protestant Dutch Church on Staten Island, also known as the Reformed Church on Staten Island (RCSI), is the oldest corporation on Staten Island still engaged in its original enterprise.  The Congregation is continuous since 1656.  The Church has been on the same spot, in what today is Port Richmond Staten Island, since 1680. The town grew up around the Church, not the other way around.  The Archives date to1688.   The Burial Place and Baptismal Records date to 1696.  The first Church was most likely a barn.  The second church, built in 1717, was destroyed by the British during the American Revolutionary War.  The third church was built in 1787.  The current, and fourth church, was built in 1844 in the Greek Revival style. It is a brick building set on a fieldstone foundation.  The front facade features a portico with twin sets of flanking brick pilasters and a central pair of fluted Doric order columns. In 1844 the Congregation reoriented the entrance to what is today Port Richmond Avenue thanks to land donated by Daniel Tompkins, Vice President under James Monroe and founder of Tompkinsville.

RCSI Congregants played pivotal roles in American history.  The Burial Place has 45 heroes of the wars that created America:  The American Revolution, The War of 1812, and The Civil War.  One of the Congregation, Cornelius Vanderbilt, amassed one of the world's greatest fortunes and created many laws and procedures that characterize our the modern business world.  The 1844 Church and 1696 Burial Place are New York City Landmarks.  The site was added to the National Register of Historic Places in 2005 and is a National Historic Site nominee.  

There is detailed information on the entire history of the Congregation from its role in early Staten Island, through the creation of our nation, to today at olddutchchurchnyc.org.

The continuity is extraordinary.  Many descendants of the early congregation still live in Port Richmond, on Staten Island, and in neighboring states.  Eighty-three Staten Island streets are named for families in the Burial Place.  The total rises to 125 streets with the names of families in the Baptismal Book.  One current Congregant's family has been with the Reformed Church since 1568 in the Netherlands.  In 1730 that same family called the Rev. Cornelis Van Santvoord (1686-1752.  RCSI Domini from 1718 to 1740.) to serve their newly formed congregation in Bensalem PA.

References

1844 establishments in New York (state)
19th-century Reformed Church in America church buildings
Churches completed in 1844
Churches in Staten Island
New York City Designated Landmarks in Staten Island
Properties of religious function on the National Register of Historic Places in Staten Island
Reformed Church in America churches in New York (state)
Reformed churches in New York City
Renaissance Revival architecture in New York City